

470001–470100 

|-bgcolor=#f2f2f2
| colspan=4 align=center | 
|}

470101–470200 

|-bgcolor=#f2f2f2
| colspan=4 align=center | 
|}

470201–470300 

|-bgcolor=#f2f2f2
| colspan=4 align=center | 
|}

470301–470400 

|-bgcolor=#f2f2f2
| colspan=4 align=center | 
|}

470401–470500 

|-bgcolor=#f2f2f2
| colspan=4 align=center | 
|}

470501–470600 

|-id=600
| 470600 Calogero ||  || Calogero (Calogero Joseph Salvatore Maurici, born 1971) is a French singer and a songwriter and composer. His greatest hits include En apesanteur, Tien an men, Face à la mer and Un jour au mauvais endroit. || 
|}

470601–470700 

|-bgcolor=#f2f2f2
| colspan=4 align=center | 
|}

470701–470800 

|-bgcolor=#f2f2f2
| colspan=4 align=center | 
|}

470801–470900 

|-bgcolor=#f2f2f2
| colspan=4 align=center | 
|}

470901–471000 

|-bgcolor=#f2f2f2
| colspan=4 align=center | 
|}

References 

470001-471000